Faces of Jim was a black-and-white British comedy television series starring Jimmy Edwards, June Whitfield and Ronnie Barker, with each episode being an individual half-hour sitcom. The first series aired as The Seven Faces of Jim, the second as Six More Faces of Jim and the third series as More Faces of Jim. All the episodes were written by Frank Muir and Denis Norden.

Cast
Jimmy Edwards - Various
June Whitfield - Various
Ronnie Barker - Various

Episodes

Series One (1961)

Series Two (1962)

Christmas Special (1962)

Series Three (1963)

Archive status
The first series of Faces of Jim survives in its entirety and so does the 1962 Christmas Short, but all of the other episodes (from series 2 and 3) were discarded by the BBC during the early 1970s, and remain missing. Some of the existing footage was used in a "Comedy Classics of the 60's" compilation VHS by Watershed Entertainment.

References

Mark Lewisohn, "Radio Times Guide to TV Comedy", BBC Worldwide Ltd, 2003

1961 British television series debuts
1963 British television series endings
1960s British sitcoms
BBC television sitcoms
Lost BBC episodes
Black-and-white British television shows
English-language television shows